An Affair of the Follies is a lost 1927 American silent romantic drama film directed by Millard Webb and distributed by First National Pictures.

Cast
 Lewis Stone as Hammersley
 Billie Dove as Tamara
 Lloyd Hughes as Jerry
 Arthur Stone as Sam the Waiter
 Arthur Hoyt as The Inventor
 Bertram Marburgh as Lew Kline
 Vera Gordon

References

External links

Stills at silenthollywood.com

1927 films
American silent feature films
Lost American films
Films directed by Millard Webb
First National Pictures films
1927 romantic drama films
American romantic drama films
American black-and-white films
1927 lost films
Lost romantic drama films
1920s American films
Silent romantic drama films
Silent American drama films